Rachel Mazuir (born 12 February 1940 in Bourg-en-Bresse) is a French politician. A member of the Socialist Party, he served in the Senate of France from 2008 until 2020, representing the Ain department.

Biography 
Professor of physical education and sports, Rachel Mazuir was elected to the municipal council of Bourg-en-Bresse in 1977, where he served as the deputy mayor from 1977 to 1989 and again from 1995 to 2001.

General councilor of the canton of Bourg-en-Bresse-Est from 1988, he took advantage of the strong progression of the left during the cantonal elections of 2008 and won the presidency of the General Council of Ain, defeating the outgoing Charles de La Verpillière on March 20, 2008.

He was elected senator in the September 2008 elections.

In the 2015 departmental elections, associated with Marie-Claire Panabières, he lost in the second round against the right-wing pair formed by Martine Tabouret and Jean-Yves Flochon, elected with 45.57% of the votes.

References

1940 births
Living people
French Senators of the Fifth Republic
Socialist Party (France) politicians
Senators of Ain
Place of birth missing (living people)